Glyphipterix umbilici is a moth of the family Glyphipterigidae. It is found on the Canary Islands and Sardinia and in Portugal and Lebanon.

The larvae feed on Umbilicus rupestris. They mine the leaves of their host plant. The mine starts as a branching corridor with a central line of green frass. Later, it becomes a full depth blotch. A larva may vacate the mine and start mining elsewhere. Pupation takes place outside of the mine. The larvae are yellowish white with a brown head. They can be found in February and April.

References

Moths described in 1927
Glyphipterigidae
Moths of Europe
Moths of the Middle East